The Palestine Pals were a minor league baseball team that played on-and-off from 1925 to 1940. The team played in the Texas Association (1925–1926), Lone Star League (1927–1929), West Dixie League (1934–1935) and East Texas League (1936–1940). It was affiliated with the St. Louis Browns from 1935 to 1938 and in 1940.

The team won two league championships, in 1926 under the tutelage of Jack Stansbury and Bob Countryman and in 1928 under Walt Alexander. Notable players include major league All-Star Bob Muncrief and veterans Boom-Boom Beck, Jack Knott, Carl Reynolds and Sarge Connally.

It was the last professional team to be based in Palestine.

References

Defunct minor league baseball teams
Baseball teams established in 1925
Baseball teams disestablished in 1940
1925 establishments in Texas
1940 disestablishments in Texas
Defunct baseball teams in Texas
Palestine, Texas
St. Louis Browns minor league affiliates
West Dixie League teams
East Texas League teams